Tirora Assembly constituency is one of the 288 Vidhan Sabha (legislative assembly) constituencies of Maharashtra state, western India. This constituency is located in Gondiya district. The delimitation of the constituency happened in 2008. The constituency which focuses on casteism rather than Development of area.

Geographical scope
Tirora taluka and Tirora Municipal Council, parts of Gondiya taluka viz. revenue
circle Gangazari, part of Goregaon taluka viz. revenue circle
Goregaon.

Representatives
 2019: Vijay Bharatlal Rahangdale, Bharatiya Janata Party.
 2014: Vijay Bharatlal Rahangdale, Bharatiya Janata Party
 2009: Khushal Bopche, Bharatiya Janata Party
 2004: Dilip Bansod, Nationalist Congress Party

References

Assembly constituencies of Maharashtra
Gondia district